was a Japanese professional baseball outfielder, first baseman and third baseman, and coach in Nippon Professional Baseball (NPB).  He played for the Chunichi Dragons and Nippon Ham Fighters from 1971 to 1994.  He went on to manage the Fighters from 2000 to 2002, and served as the hitting coach for the Japan national baseball team during the 2006 World Baseball Classic.

Early life
Oshima was born in Ōita Prefecture on October 16, 1950.  He attended Nakatsu Kogyo High School.  He was drafted by the Chunichi Dragons in the third round of the 1968 draft.

Professional career

Playing
Oshima made his NPB debut with the Dragons in 1971.  He won two Central League pennants with the team.  His best year came in 1979, when he recorded a career-high batting average of .317, and had the most hits in the league with 159.  He also hit 36 home runs that year, the most in his career, but finished behind Masayuki Kakefu (who hit 48) as the league leader in home runs.  Four seasons later, Oshima led the league in home runs with 36.  He joined the Nippon Ham Fighters in 1988, finishing his NPB career with the team in 1994.  He played 2,638 games over his 24-year career, amassing 2,204 hits, 382 home runs, and 1,234 runs batted in.

Coaching
Oshima became manager of the Fighters in 2000.  He recorded his only winning season that same year, with the team finishing 69–65.  Overall, he had a 181–225 record in his three seasons with the team.  He later became the hitting coach of the Japan national baseball team for the 2006 World Baseball Classic, the first edition of the tournament which the Japanese team won.

Later life
Oshima was inducted into the Meikyukai.  He disclosed in February 2017 that he had colon cancer.  He nonetheless continued working as a baseball commentator and also blogged about his fight against the disease. Oshima died on June 30, 2021, at the age of 70.

References

External links
, and NPB (in Japanese)

1950 births
2021 deaths
People from Nakatsu, Ōita
Baseball people from Ōita Prefecture
Nippon Professional Baseball outfielders
Nippon Professional Baseball infielders
Japanese baseball players
Chunichi Dragons players
Nippon Ham Fighters players
Managers of baseball teams in Japan
Hokkaido Nippon-Ham Fighters managers
Deaths from colorectal cancer